The Australian cricket team toured India from 12 February to 26 March 2013, played a four-match Test series against India. During the 1st Test, Mahendra Singh Dhoni set the highest score by an Indian Test captain, scoring 224 runs, beating the previous record held by Sachin Tendulkar. India won the four Test series in a 4–0 whitewash to win the Border–Gavaskar Trophy. This was first time Australia lost a test series 4-0 after their defeat against South Africa in 1970.

Squads
Australia introduced two debutants, Moisés Henriques and Glenn Maxwell while India also introduced two debutants, Bhuvneshwar Kumar and Ajinkya Rahane.

Tour matches

Two-day: Indian Board President's XI v Australians

Three-day: India A v Australians

Test series (Border–Gavaskar Trophy)

1st Test

India lost the toss and were asked to bowl on a pitch that will soon be a ripper for spinners. Aus got off to a quick start but started to struggle as spinners were introduced and lost 2 wickets before lunch. Post lunch it was Ashwin show completely as the off spinner picked 3 quick wickets. but resistance from Henriques and Clarke helped Aus reach 380.

India had a poor start and lost openers quickly. However, MS Dhoni along with tail-ender Bhuvneshvar had a 9th wicket record partnership which took India's total to more than 500. In the second innings, the Indian spinners struck regularly, and except Henriques, no other Aussie showed any resistance, thus leaving India with a small target. Sachin Tendulkar finished the match by hitting two sixes off consecutive balls.

2nd Test

India again lost the toss but this time the pacers extracted early movement which aided the spinners and resulted in low 1st innings total for Australia. Clarke and Wade had a useful partnership but the constant loss of wickets meant Clarke declared early. India, in their first innings, thanks to Pujara and Vijay for the partnership of 370 runs, scored 500+ again and the spinners in the 2nd innings dismissed Australia cheaply. This match marked the last test in the career of Virender Sehwag .

3rd Test

The first day was lost to rain, and thanks to Smith and Starc's batting, Australia got a healthy first innings total. India, however, with Dhawan's quickfire debut century and steady batting from Vijay, got a small lead. In the second innings, the Indian bowlers again dismissed the Australians for a low score and India won on the last day with less than 4 overs left.

4th Test
{{Test match
| date = 22–26 March 2013
| team1 = 
| team2 = 

| score-team1-inns1 = 262 (112.1 overs)
| runs-team1-inns1 = Peter Siddle 51 (136)
| wickets-team1-inns1 = Ravichandran Ashwin 5/57 (34 overs)

| score-team2-inns1 = 272 (70.2 overs)
| runs-team2-inns1 = Murali Vijay 57 (123)
| wickets-team2-inns1 = Nathan Lyon 7/94 (23.2 overs)

| score-team1-inns2 = 164 (46.3 overs)
| runs-team1-inns2 = Peter Siddle 50 (45)
| wickets-team1-inns2 = Ravindra Jadeja 5/58 (16 overs)

| score-team2-inns2 = 158/4 (31.2 overs)
| runs-team2-inns2 = Cheteshwar Pujara 82* (92)
| wickets-team2-inns2 = Glenn Maxwell 2/54 (12
 overs)

| result = India won by 6 wickets
| report = Scorecard
| venue = Feroz Shah Kotla, Delhi
| umpires = Aleem Dar (Pak) and Richard Kettleborough (Eng)
| motm = Ravindra Jadeja (Ind)
| rain =
| notes = Ajinkya Rahane (Ind) made his Test debut.
Ravindra Jadeja (Ind) took his first five-wicket haul in Tests.
}}

Clarke was ruled out due to Back injury and Watson was the captain. The spinners wreaked havoc in the match, and only Siddle from Australia and Pujara from India showed some resistance. Jadeja got his best bowling figures in Tests in the second innings and India won the test to record their first-ever whitewash against Australia.

Australian team disciplinary breach Homeworkgate'' refers to a controversial sequence of events that took place during the 2013 tour of India.

Incident
Australia lost the first two Tests of the series, the second of them by a heavy margin: an innings and 135 runs.  In this game, Australia became the first team in Test cricket to declare in its first innings, and then lose the match by an innings. With two Test matches left, the best Australia could hope for was a drawn series.  Before the 3rd Test, four Australian players – Shane Watson, James Pattinson (both of whom had played in the 2nd Test), Mitchell Johnson and Usman Khawaja (who were in the touring party) – were made ineligible for the match following a breach of discipline. Michael Clarke, the captain, revealed that the extreme step had been taken as a result of repeated infractions. Former players reacted with astonishment at the harsh decision taken by the team management. Vice-captain Watson returned to the tour, after he flew back to Sydney after being dropped. The incident referred to an assignment given by head coach Mickey Arthur to the players requiring them to give in writing ways to improve their performance to help the team. The aforementioned players did not submit their replies within the time stipulated and combined with previous incidents of team breaches they were suspended for one test each.

Statistics

Individual

Team

Australia
 Michael Clarke reached 7,000 Test career runs when he scored 130 in the 1st innings of the 1st Test.
 Michael Clarke scored his 23rd Test century when he scored 130 in the 1st innings of the 1st Test.
 Moisés Henriques scored his first Test half-century when he scored 68 in the 1st innings of the 1st Test.
 James Pattinson took his third five-wicket haul in the 1st innings of the 1st Test.
 Moisés Henriques took his first Test wicket when he bowled Harbhajan Singh in the 1st innings of the 1st Test.
 Glenn Maxwell took his first Test wicket when he got Murali Vijay out in the 1st innings of the 2nd Test.
 Peter Siddle took his seventh five-wicket haul in the 1st innings of the 3rd Test.
 Nathan Lyon took his third five-wicket haul in the 1st innings of the 4th Test.

India
 Ravichandran Ashwin took his sixth five-wicket haul in the 1st innings of the 1st Test.
 Virat Kohli scored his fourth Test century when he scored 107 in the 1st innings of the 1st Test.
 MS Dhoni reached 4,000 Test career runs when he scored 224 in the 1st innings of the 1st Test.
 MS Dhoni scored his first Test double century and his sixth Test century when he scored 224 in the 1st innings of the 1st Test.
 Ravichandran Ashwin took his seventh five-wicket haul and completed ten wickets in a match for the second time in the 2nd innings of the 1st Test.
 Bhuvneshwar Kumar took his first Test wicket when he bowled David Warner in the 1st innings of the 2nd Test and he is the first bowler to take his first wicket as bowled in all three formats of cricket.
 Cheteshwar Pujara scored his fourth Test century and 2nd double century when he scored 204 in the 1st innings of the 2nd Test.
 Murali Vijay scored his second Test century when he scored 167 in the 1st innings of the 2nd Test.
 Cheteshwar Pujara reached 1,000 Test Career runs when he scored 204 in the 1st innings of the 2nd Test.
 Virat Kohli reached 1,000 Test Career runs when he scored 34 in the 1st innings of the 2nd Test.
 Ravichandran Ashwin took his eighth five-wicket haul in the 2nd innings of the 2nd Test.
 Shikhar Dhawan scored his first Test century (on debut) when he scored 187 in the 1st innings of the 3rd Test.
 Murali Vijay scored his third Test century when he scored 153 in the 1st innings of the 3rd Test.
 Ravichandran Ashwin took his ninth five-wicket haul in the 1st innings of the 4th Test.
 Murali Vijay reached 1,000 Test career runs when he scored 57 in the 1st innings of the 4th Test.
 Pragyan Ojha reached 100 Test career wickets when he took the wicket of James Pattinson in the 1st innings of the 4th Test.
 Ravindra Jadeja took his first five-wicket haul in the 2nd innings of the 4th Test.

Records from the series
 MS Dhoni's 224 in the first Test match is the third highest(Highest by an Indian), individual score by a wicket-keeper batsman. (third to Andy Flower's 232 and Kumar Sangakkara's 230)
 Shikhar Dhawan's 187 is the fastest ever century by a batsman on his debut.
 Australia became first-ever country to declare the match on the first day and lose it by an innings.

Notes

References

External links
 Border-Gavaskar Trophy on ESPN Cricinfo

2012-13
International cricket competitions in 2012–13
2013 in Indian cricket
2013 in Australian cricket
Indian cricket seasons from 2000–01